"Stoopid!" (stylized as Stoopid¡) is a 2011 song by the singer CeCe Peniston. The composition written by Lupe Rose, CEO of West Swagg Music Group, and the singer herself was produced by Aphiliated and The Incredibles.

Credits and personnel
 CeCe Peniston – lead vocal, writer
 Lupe Rose – writer
 Aphiliated – producer, remix
 The Incredibles – producer, remix

Track listings and formats
 MD, US, #UMI 0080209708792
 "Stoopid! (Original)" – 3:36

 MD, US, #UMI 00802097090823
 "Stoopid! (Remix)" – 4:05

 MD, US, Promo, #()
 "Stoopid! (Original)" – 3:36
 "Stoopid! (Remix)" – 4:05
 "Stoopid! (Remix Acapella)" – 4:00

 MD, US, Promo, #()
 "Stoopid! (Remix Instrumental)" – 3:30

References

General

Specific

External links 
 

2011 singles
CeCe Peniston songs
Songs written by CeCe Peniston
Eurodance songs